Marcel Granollers and Tommy Robredo were the defending champions but decided not to participate.

No.1 seeds Oliver Marach and Alexander Peya won the title beating František Čermák and Filip Polášek in the final, 6–3, 6–2.

Seeds

Draw

Draw

References
 Main Draw

Heineken Open - Doubles
2012 Heineken Open